Bad Frequencies is the sixth studio album by American post-hardcore band Hawthorne Heights. The album was released on April 27, 2018 through Pure Noise Records.

Background and production
Vocalist/guitarist JT Woodruff stated that the album was written over the course of a year in 2017 while the band was touring, saying "We played 170 shows in 2017, wrote every moment that we could, then demoed, then recorded an album. I think we fit everything we possibly could in 365 days, and we are very proud of that."

On May 31, 2017, the band released a 30-second music video teaser for the song "Push Me Away" via their Facebook page. A digital single for the song was released the same day. The full music video for "Push Me Away" debuted on June 5 via Dying Scene. The band stated that the song would appear on a new studio album, which at the time was untitled. Bad Frequencies was recorded at Capitol House Studios, and produced by the band and Mark Ingram, who also acted as engineer. Cameron Webb mixed the recordings, before they were mastered by Andrew Alekel.

Release
The second advance single from the album, "Pink Hearts," was released on March 1, 2018. With the single's release, it was announced that the new album would be titled Bad Frequencies with a release date of April 27, 2018. A music video for the song "Just Another Ghost," directed by Benny Gagliardi, was released on March 21. The title track was released as a single on July 11 with a music video for the song being released on September 4. Music videos for "Starlighter (Echo, Utah)" and "Pills" were released on May 14 and September 9, 2019, respectively.

Track listing
All tracks written by Hawthorne Heights.

Personnel
Personnel per booklet.

Hawthorne Heights
 JT Woodruff – lead vocals, rhythm guitar
 Mark McMillon – lead guitar, unclean vocals
 Matt Ridenour – bass
 Chris Popadak – drums

Additional musicians
 Will Deely – additional vocals
 Sienna Skies – additional vocals

Production and design
 Hawthorne Heights – producer, art direction
 Mark Ingram – producer, engineer
 Cameron Webb – mixing
 Andrew Alekel – mastering
 Kevin Moore – art direction, layout, design
 Adam Fields – album photography
 John Fleischman – band photography

Charts

References

2018 albums
Hawthorne Heights albums
Pure Noise Records albums